Taekwondo was an African Games event at its inaugural edition in 1987 and has continued to feature at the competition in each of its subsequent editions.

Editions

Medal table
Last updated after the 2015 edition; Next update after the conclusion of the 2019 African Games

External links
 Taekwondo at the African Games, Taekwondo Database.

 
Sports at the African Games
African Games
African Games